Euchromia paula is a moth of the subfamily Arctiinae. It was described by Röber in 1887. It is found on Sulawesi in Indonesia.

References

Moths described in 1887
Euchromiina